The 2001 Ukrainian Cup Final was a football match that took place at the NSC Olimpiyskiy on May 27, 2001. The match was the 10th Ukrainian Cup Final and it was contested by Shakhtar Donetsk and CSKA Kyiv. The 2001 Ukrainian Cup Final was the tenth to be held in the Ukrainian capital Kyiv. Shakhtar won by two goals.

Match details

References

External links 
 Calendar of Matches - Schedule of the 2000-01 Ukrainian Cup on the Ukrainian Soccer History web-site (ukrsoccerhistory.com). 

Cup Final
Ukrainian Cup finals
Ukrainian Cup Final 2001
Ukrainian Cup Final 2001
Ukrainian Cup Final 2001